Cychrus deuveianus is a species of ground beetle in the subfamily of Carabinae. It was described by Cavazzuti in 1998.

References

deuveianus
Beetles described in 1998